Human sexuality and the Holocaust is a topic explored in witness testimony, fiction, and academic research.

References

The Holocaust
Holocaust